(the Parisian life) was a French weekly magazine founded in Paris in 1863 and was published without interruption until 1970. It was popular at the start of the 20th century. Originally it covered novels, sports, theater, music and the arts. In 1905 the magazine changed hands and the new editor Charles Saglio changed its format to suit the modern reader. It soon evolved into a mildly risqué erotic publication. During World War I, General Pershing personally warned American servicemen against purchasing the magazine, which boosted its popularity in the United States.

La Vie Parisienne was hugely successful because it combined a new mix of subjects—short stories, veiled gossip and fashion banter, also comments about subjects from love and the arts to the stock exchange—with beautiful cartoons and full-page color illustrations by leading artists of the age. Alongside this the magazine also reflected the changing interests and values of the start of the 20th century population such as fashion and frivolity.

The artwork of La Vie parisienne reflected the stylization of Art Nouveau and Art Deco illustration, mirroring the aesthetic of the age as well as the values, and this coupled with the intellectualism, wit and satire of its written contributions was a combination that proved irresistible to the French public.

The largest collection of La Vie parisienne magazine artwork in the UK is held by The Advertising Archives, a free-to-view resource holding cover and interior artwork of illustrators including George Barbier, Chéri Herouard, Georges Léonnec and Maurice Milliere.

The historical La Vie parisienne ceased to exist in 1970. A new magazine of the same name started in 1984 and is still in existence.

Notable contributors

 George Barbier
 Brada
 Pierre Brissaud
 Umberto Brunelleschi
 Zyg Brunner
 Colette
 Fabien Fabiano 
 Fernand Fau
 Henry Gerbault
 Sibylle Riqueti de Mirabeau (as Gyp)
 Chéri Herouard
 Joseph Hémard
 Raphael Kirchner
 Joseph Kuhn-Régnier
 Georges Léonnec
 Maurice Milliere
 Moi Ver
 René Vincent
 Gerda Wegener
 Sacha Zaliouk

References

Bibliography

External links

 
  (volume 4, 22 January – 9 April 1870)

1863 establishments in France
1970 disestablishments in France
Art Nouveau magazines
Defunct magazines published in France
French art publications
French-language magazines
Weekly magazines published in France
Magazines established in 1863
Magazines disestablished in 1970
Magazines published in Paris